Club Deportivo Juventud Olímpica, commonly known as Juventud Olímpica   was a Salvadoran professional football club based in San Salvador.

History
On January 13, 1939 the club merged with Maya to be named Juventus, however one year the club reverted to its old name leaving for Club Maya to become defunct. In 1974–1975, the club rebranded itself as Negocios Internacionales and it only lasted one year reverting to Juventud Olímpica. 
The club continued to play until they withdrew from the Salvadoran Primera División after the 1978/79 season. 
The last played in ADFA San Salvador, fourth division of the salvadoran in 2019.

Honours
These Honours are updated to February 2022.
Throughout its history, the club has managed several national and regional titles. These include two Primera division titles.

Domestic honours

League
 Primera División and predecessors 
 Champions (2): 1971, 1973
Runner-up (4): 1952–53, 1963–64, 1972, 1974–75

Records

Concacaf competitions record
{| class="wikitable" align="center"
|-
! Competition
! Played
! Won
! Drawn
! Lost
! GF
! GA
|-
| Copa Interclubes UNCAF || 30 || 6 || 5 || 19 || 25 || 49
|-
| CONCACAF Champions League || 8 || 1 || 3 || 5 || 9 || 12
|-
| TOTAL || 38 || 7 || 8 || 24'' || 34|| 61|}Copa Interclubes UNCAF: 2 appearancesBest: Fifth Place
1973 : Fifth Place
1975 : Sixth PlaceCONCACAF Champions League: 3 appearancesBest''': Second Round
1973 : First Round
1974 : Second Round
1975 : First Round

Historical Matches

Notable players
  Orlando “Calulo” Hernández

Team captains

List of Coaches
Throughout its history, Juventud Olimpica has had many and varied coaches among its history, the two most noteworthy coaches are Argentinian Mario Carlos Rey and Juan Quarterone, as they both won primera division titles with Juventud Olimpica.

   Luis Comitante (1967)
  Mario Carlos Rey (1971- February 1972)
  Juan Quarterone (1973)
  Gregorio Bundio (1974)
  Ricardo Tomasino (1974–1975)
  Victor Manuel Ochoa (1975)
  Walter Cifuentes (1999)
  Luis Ángel León (2000)
  Raúl Magaña (2001–2003)
  Jorge Tupinambá dos Santos
 Santiago Chicas
 Mauro Liberia

References

Juventud Olimpica
1937 establishments in El Salvador
2007 disestablishments in El Salvador